Pollex lobifera is a moth of the family Erebidae first described by George Hampson in 1926. It is known from Luzon in the Philippines.

The wingspan is 12–13 mm. The forewing is narrow and blackish brown. The hindwing is unicolorous brown with an indistinct black discal spot and the underside unicolorous brown.

References

Micronoctuini
Moths described in 1926